Roadwalking is a thru-hiking term, indicating a walk on a road instead of a trail. It usually provides an easier way to reach a farther point on the trail, e.g. by avoiding steep mountain ascents.  A roadwalk is an unavoidable part of some long trail systems, such as the partially unfinished Continental Divide Trail and North Country Trail.

Roadwalking is not to be confused with "yellow blazing", or traveling in a car instead of by foot.

Hiking